Munyaradzi Thomas Kingsley "Radzi" Chinyanganya (born 12 September 1986) is a British presenter and broadcaster. He co-presented the BBC children's TV programme Blue Peter from 2013 until 2019, and the ITV game show Cannonball in 2017. Previously he presented Wild on CBBC and was the host of Match of the Day Kickabout from 2013 until 2014, when Ben Shires took over. In October 2018, it was announced that Chinyanganya would be working for American professional wrestling company WWE for its NXT UK brand, as a backstage interviewer.

Early life
Chinyanganya was born in Oxford, Oxfordshire, and lived there for his first ten years, subsequently moving to Wolverhampton where he spent his teenage years. He was born to a Scottish mother (from Dundee) and a Zimbabwean father. He attended Adams' Grammar School in Newport, Shropshire. A graduate of Loughborough University, he worked on Loughborough University's TV and radio station while a student.

Following university he pursued an attempt to join the British skeleton bobsleigh team for the 2014 Winter Olympics, although he was unsuccessful in qualification rounds.

Career

Sports hosting
At a screen test in The O2 Arena, he was selected as the official weightlifting presenter at the London 2012 Olympics. He hosted the weightlifting tournament, spoke on stage at the Excel Arena, interviewed athletes, introduced the weight categories and entertained the crowd. He was invited back to present the London 2012 Paralympic Games. He was a presenter with the BBC coverage of the 2018 Winter Olympics in Pyeongchang, South Korea and the 2020 Snooker World Championship, Sheffield. He was also the official commentator of the 2018 World's Ultimate Strongman Competition in Dubai. 

In 2021, Chinyanganya was part of the Eurosport presenting team at the Tokyo Olympics. It was later announced he would become the main presenter for snookers' Triple Crown events on Eurosport, taking over from Colin Murray who had departed the role at the end of the 2020–21 snooker season.

Television
Chinyanganya presented Your Body: Your Image for BBC Two, an educational series about body image in schools. He co-presented Wild on CBBC with Naomi Wilkinson and Tim Warwood which first aired in 2013. In October 2013, he became the 37th presenter of Blue Peter after being announced following the departure of Helen Skelton. He was a reporter and presenter of CBBC's Match of the Day Kickabout.

In January 2020, he competed in the twelfth series of Dancing on Ice alongside professional partner Jess Hatfield.

Other work
He was a contestant in Sky One's Gladiators in 2008 and reached the semi finals and was the only contestant in history to attempt the eliminator wearing a swimming cap. 
He was selected to attend Kiss FM’s Presenter Academy, and spent the whole summer online reporting for Bauer Media radio station. In this role he interviewed artists and the public and sampled Olympic entertainment in London.

He has a cameo as Mi in Kung Fu Panda 3.

He is a former backstage interviewer for WWE's NXT UK brand.

He is also the Sky Sports NBA presenter.

He also does backstage interviews for Giants Live strongman competitions.

In 2021, he hosted the University of Derby’s open day.

Personal life
He is Christian, and has stated in interview that his Christian faith is one of his driving passions. He has described his parents as being Christians, but from different Christian denominations, leading to an inter-faith upbringing. In November 2020 Chinyanganya announced on the BBC's Songs of Praise programme that his own baptism had taken place at the Roman Catholic church of St Leonard and St Fergus in Ardler, a suburb of Dundee.

Filmography

Television

Film

References

External links 
Sochi 2014: Blue Peter's Radzi Chinyanganya on the skeleton
Pyeongchang 2018: Winter Olympics 2018 on the BBC

1986 births
Living people
Black British television personalities
English people of Zimbabwean descent
English people of Scottish descent
People educated at Adams' Grammar School
Alumni of Loughborough University
People from Oxford
Blue Peter presenters
English Roman Catholics